Belenois larima is a butterfly in the  family Pieridae. It is found in Senegal.

Taxonomy
This species is of doubtful status. Aurivillius treated it as a west African race of Belenois thysa in 1898, but treated it as distinct in 1910.  Larsen regarded it to possibly be a natural hybrid and suggested that it should be treated as a nomen dubium in 2005.

References

Butterflies described in 1836
Pierini
Butterflies of Africa